Raumberg (Sächsische Schweiz) is a mountain of Saxony, southeastern Germany.

Mountains of Saxon Switzerland
Elbe Sandstone Mountains